The English surname Percy is of Norman origin, coming from Normandy to England,  United Kingdom. It was from the House of Percy, Norman lords of Northumberland, derives from the village of Percy-en-Auge in Normandy. From there, it came into use as a given name. It is also a short form of the given name Percival, Perseus, etc.

People

Surname
 Alf Percy, Scottish footballer
 Algernon Percy (disambiguation)
 Charles H. Percy (1919–2011), American businessman and politician
 Eileen Percy (1900–1973), Irish-born American actress
 George Percy (1580–1632), English explorer, author, and colonial governor
 Henry Percy, 1st Earl of Northumberland (1341–1408), son of Henry de Percy, 3rd Baron Percy, and a descendant of Henry III of England
 Henry Percy (Hotspur) (1364–1403), eldest son of Henry Percy
 Hugh Percy, 2nd Duke of Northumberland (1742–1817), British lieutenant-general in the American Revolutionary War
James Gilbert Percy (1921–2015), American Marine officer, flying ace and Navy Cross recipient
 John Percy (disambiguation)
 LeRoy Percy (1860–1929), American planter and politician
 Pierre-Francois Percy (1754–1825), French surgeon
 Richard Percy (died 1648), English soldier
 Samuel Percy (1750-1820) Irish-born wax-modeller of portraits
 Thomas Percy (disambiguation)
 Walker Percy (1916–1990), American author
 William Percy (disambiguation)

Given name
 Percy Abercrombie (1884–1964), Australian football player
 Percy Addleshaw (1866–1916), English barrister and writer
 Percy Adlon (born 1935), German film and television director, writer, and producer
 Percy Barnevik (born 1941), Swedish business executive
 Percy Williams Bridgman (1882–1961), Nobel Prize winner in physics
 Percy Butler (disambiguation), multiple people
 Percy Cherrett (1899–1984), English footballer
 Percy Cox (1864–1937), British administrator and diplomat
 Percy Dawson (disambiguation)
 Percy Dearmer (1867–1936), English priest and liturgical writer
 Percy Dickie (1907–1987), Scottish footballer with Aberdeen, St Johnstone, Blackburn
 Percy Edwards (1908–1996), English entertainer, ornithologist and animal impersonator
 Percy Faith (1908–1976), Canadian-born bandleader, orchestrator, composer and conductor
 Percy Fawcett (1867–?), British soldier, archaeologist and explorer
 Percy Fernando, Sri Lankan Sinhala army major general
 Percy French (1854–1920), Irish songwriter, entertainer and painter
 Percy Gardner (1846–1937), English classical archaeologist
 Percy Grainger (1882–1961), Australian-born composer and pianist
 Percy Grant (Royal Navy officer) (1867–1952), Royal Navy admiral and Chief of Navy of the Royal Australian Navy
 Percy Stickney Grant (1860–1927), American Episcopal priest
 Percy Harvin (born 1988), American football player
 Percy Heath (1923–2005), American jazz bassist
 Percy Helton (1894–1971), American actor
 Percy Herbert (disambiguation)
 Percy Jones (disambiguation)
 Percy Hague Jowett (1882–1955), British artist and arts administrator
 Percy Lavon Julian (1899–1975), American research chemist
 Percy William Justyne (1812–1883), English artist
 Percy Kachipande (born 1944), Malawian diplomat
 Percy Kilbride (1888–1964), American actor
 Percy Lansdale (born 1928), Iraqi football player
 Percy Lowe (1870–1948), English surgeon and ornithologist
 Percy MacKaye (1875–1956), American dramatist and poet
 Percy Mahendra Rajapaksa (born 1945), Prime Minister of Sri Lanka
 Percy Marmont (1883–1977), English actor
 Percy Metcalfe (1895–1970), English artist and currency designer
 Percy Robert Miller, aka Master P, hip-hop artist and entrepreneur
 Percy Romeo Miller (born 1989), aka Romeo Miller, hip-hop artist, college basketball player, entertainer and son of Percy Robert
 Percy Montgomery (born 1974), South African rugby player
 Percy Erskine Nobbs (1875–1964), Scottish-born Canadian architect
 Percy Noble (Royal Navy officer) (1880–1955), British Second World War admiral, Royal Navy Commander-in-Chief, Western Approaches
 Percy Verner Noble (1902–1996), Canadian Member of Parliament
 Percy Orthwein (1888–1957), American businessman
 Percy Parsons (1878–1944), American actor
 Percy Pepoon (1861–1939), American politician
 Percy Quin (1872–1932), American politician
 Percy Avery Rockefeller (1878–1934), American businessman
 Percy Rojas (born 1949), Peruvian football player
 Percy Ross (1916–2001), American philanthropist
 Percy Schmeiser (1931-2020), Saskatchewan Member of Legislative Assembly, farmer, and Canadian Supreme Court defendant
 Percy Shaw (1890–1976), English inventor and businessman
 Percy Bysshe Shelley (1792–1822), English poet
 Percy Sledge (1940–2015), American R&B and soul singer
 Percy Smith (disambiguation)
 Percy Spencer (1894–1970), American engineer and inventor of the microwave oven
 Percy Spender (1897–1985), Australian politician and diplomat
 Percy Stone (1856–1934), British architect
 Percy Sutton (1920–2009), American politician, civil rights activist and businessman
 Percy Tau (1994), South African football player
 Percy Thrower (1913–1988), British gardener, horticulturist, broadcaster and writer
 Percy Trompf (1902–1964), Australian commercial artist
 Percy Vear (1911–1983), British professional boxer
 Percy Wenrich (1887–1952), American composer 
 Percy White (1888–1918), Australian rugby player
 Percy White (cricketer) (1868–1946), New Zealand cricketer
 Percy White (nuclear scientist) (1916–2013), British chemist, metallurgist and nuclear scientist
 Percy Whitlock (1903–1946), English organist and composer
 Percy Wickremasekera, Sri Lankan Sinhala Trotskyist politician, lawyer, and trade unionist
 Percy Williams (disambiguation)
 Perce Wilson (1890–1936), American football player
 Percy Wilson (footballer) (1889–1941), Australian football player
 Percy Wyndham (disambiguation)
 Percy M. Young (1912–2004), British musicologist, editor, organist, composer, conductor and teacher
 Percy Yutar (1911–2002), South African attorney-general and prosecutor of Nelson Mandela in the 1963 Rivonia treason trial

Fictional characters
 Sir Percy Blakeney, the Scarlet Pimpernel in Baroness Orczy's 1905 novel of the same name and various related works
 Percy Dovetonsils, created and played by American television comedian Ernie Kovacs
 Percy Jackson, a son of Poseidon and main character in the Percy Jackson & the Olympians book series
 Judge Percy Merrick, character in High Noon
 Percy Pea, from the VHS and DVD series VeggieTales
 Percy Polie, on the children's show Rolie Polie Olie
 Lord Percy Percy, two related characters in the popular British sitcom Blackadder
 Percival "Percy" Fredrickstein Von Musel Klossowski de Rolo III, a human gunslinger in the D&D web series Critical Role
 Percy Sugden, on the British soap opera Coronation Street
 Percy Weasley, in the Harry Potter series
 Percy Wetmore, from Stephen King's novel The Green Mile
 Percy the Park Keeper, in the British children's TV series of the same name
 Percy the Small Engine, in the Railway Series and Thomas & Friends
 Percy the Dog, in Pocahontas
 Percy, on the animated American TV series Clarence
 Percy the Penguin, on the children's show Jake and the Never Land Pirates
 Black Knight (Sir Percy), a Marvel Comics character
 Percy, on the animated American television series Amphibia
 Percy, a hunter in the video game Identity V

See also
 Percie Charlton (1867–1954), Australian cricketer

External links
Nominal Library: Percy

English given names
Masculine given names
Hypocorisms
English masculine given names